PHD finger protein 3 is a protein that in humans is encoded by the PHF3 gene.

References

Further reading

External links 
 

Transcription factors